Robert Wouter Hans Pieter "Rob" Scheller (born 11 June 1927) is a Dutch art historian. He was professor of art history, specializing in the Middle Ages, at the University of Amsterdam between 1969 and 1992. 

Scheller was born in Amsterdam to a Swiss mother. He obtained his doctorate in art history at the University of Amsterdam in 1966 under professor J.Q. van Regteren Altena.

Scheller was elected member of the Royal Netherlands Academy of Arts and Sciences in 1981.

References

1927 births
Living people
Dutch art historians
Members of the Royal Netherlands Academy of Arts and Sciences
University of Amsterdam alumni
Academic staff of the University of Amsterdam